Şəfəq (also, Shefek) is a village and municipality in the Beylagan Rayon of Azerbaijan.  It has a population of 1,145.

References 

Populated places in Beylagan District